Małec  is a village in the administrative district of Gmina Radgoszcz, within Dąbrowa County, Lesser Poland Voivodeship, in southern Poland.

The village has a population of 560.

References

Villages in Dąbrowa County